Constantin Preis (born 16 May 1998) is a German athlete specialising in the 400 metres hurdles. He represented his country at the 2019 World Championships in Doha without advancing from the first round.

His personal best in the event was 49.23 seconds set in Zürich in 2019, he improved it to 48.60 at Centre sportif Bout-du-Monde, in Geneva (SUI) on 12 June 2021.

Personal life
Born in Moldova, Preis moved to Germany at the age of 11.

International competitions

References

1998 births
Living people
Sportspeople from Chișinău
German male hurdlers
German people of Moldovan descent
Moldovan emigrants to Germany
World Athletics Championships athletes for Germany
German national athletics champions
Athletes (track and field) at the 2020 Summer Olympics
Olympic athletes of Germany